Bromus arenarius is a species of brome grass known by the common name Australian brome.

It is native to much of Australia, and it is known in New Zealand and parts of North America as an introduced species. It is an annual grass growing up to 60 centimeters tall. Its narrow leaves are coated in soft hairs. The inflorescence is a wide array of nodding, flat spikelets, each on an individual stalk that may be curved or wavy.

External links
Jepson Manual Treatment
USDA Plants Profile
Photo gallery

arenarius
Flora of Australia
Flora of Lebanon